Saccocalyx is a genus of sponge belonging to the family Euplectellidae.

The species of this genus are found in Pacific Ocean.

Species:

Saccocalyx careyi 
Saccocalyx microhexactin 
Saccocalyx pedunculatus 
Saccocalyx tetractinus

References

Sponges